Brenneman may refer to:

 Daniel Brenneman (1834 – 1919), American Mennonite minister and church leader.
 John Brenneman (born January 5, 1943), Canadian former professional ice hockey player.
 Ron Brenneman (born 1947), president and chief executive officer of Petro-Canada. 
 Greg Brenneman (born 1961), Chairman of CCMP Capital.
 Amy Brenneman (born 1964), American actress, writer, and producer.
 Linda Brenneman (born 1965), American road cyclist.
 Charlie Brenneman (born 1981), American mixed martial artist.